This is a list of player transfers involving RFU Championship teams before or during the 2014–15 season.

Bedford Blues

Players In
 Anthony Fenner from  Viadana
 Nick Fenton-Wells from  Saracens
 Jim Wigglesworth from  Cambridge RUFC
 Dean Adamson from  Ampthill
 Billy Moss from  London Welsh
 Harry Wells from  Leicester Tigers
 Justin Blanchet from  Exeter Chiefs
 Henry Staff from  Rosslyn Park
 Camilo Parilli-Ocampo from  Ealing Trailfinders
 James Currie from  Yorkshire Carnegie
 Tom Williams from  Leicester Lions
 Steffan Jones from  Newport Gwent Dragons (season-loan)
 Daryl Dyer from  Ampthill
 Josh Buggea from  Worcester Warriors
 Eoin Sheriff from  Saracens (season-loan)
 Viliamo Hakalo from  Toa Saracens

Players Out
 Mark Atkinson to  Gloucester Rugby
 Sacha Harding retired
 Brendan Burke retired
 Darren Fearn to  Sale Sharks
 Corey Hircock to  Cambridge RUFC
 Ben Cooper to  London Welsh

Bristol

Players In
 Dwayne Peel from  Sale Sharks
 Anthony Perenise from  Bath Rugby
 David Lemi from  Worcester Warriors
 Jack O'Connell from  Leinster
 Darren Hudson from  Leinster
 Max Crumpton from  Saracens
 Nick Köster from  Bath Rugby
 Jack Lam from  Hurricanes
 Craig Hampson from  Yorkshire Carnegie
 Matthew Morgan from  Ospreys
 Ryan Jones from  Ospreys
 Ross Rennie from  Edinburgh Rugby
 Olly Robinson from  Moseley
 Chris Brooker from  Worcester Warriors
 Ian Evans from  Ospreys
 Gareth Maule from  Scarlets
 Josh Ovens from  Bath Rugby

Players Out
 George Watkins to  Cardiff Blues
 James Merriman retired
 Ruki Tipuna to  Newcastle Falcons
 Steve Uren to  Tasman Makos
 Fautua Otto released
 Errie Claassens to  London Scottish
 Bruce Douglas to  Cardiff RFC
 Mariano Sambucetti retired
 Will Davis to  Ealing Trailfinders
 Adam Hughes to  Exeter Chiefs
 Stuart McInally to  Edinburgh Rugby
 Tristan Roberts to  London Welsh
 Iain Grieve to  Plymouth Albion
 Callum Braley to  Gloucester Rugby
 Mark Lilley to  London Scottish (season-loan)
 Ollie Hayes to  Yorkshire Carnegie
 Sammy Speight to  Coventry RFC
 Jason Hobson retired
 Bryan Rennie to  Hong Kong Scottish
 Rupert Freestone to  Clifton RFC
 Adam D'Arcy released
 Redford Pennycook released
 James Grindal retired
 Ross Johnson retired

Cornish Pirates

Players In
 Adam Jameson from  Bath Rugby
 Ben Trevaskis from  Penryn
 Paul Andrew from  Worcester Warriors
 Jamal Ford-Robinson from  Cambridge RUFC
 George Collenette from  Guernsey
 Dan Lee from  Taunton
 Bertie Hopkins from  Guildford
 Charlie Davey from  London Irish

Players Out
 Neale Patrick to  Plymouth Albion
 Gary Johnson to  Ealing Trailfinders
 Junior Fatialofa retired
 Peter Joyce retired
 Angus Sinclair released
 Kyle Marriott to  Redruth
 Shane Cahill to  London Welsh
 James Sandford to  London Welsh
 Max Maidment to  London Scottish
 Ben Prescott to  London Scottish
 Jake Parker to  Chinnor

Doncaster Knights

Players In
 Colin Quigley from  Rotherham Titans
 Jon Phelan from  Atlantic Rock
 Tyler Hotson from  London Scottish
 Alex Shaw from  Nottingham
 Latu Makaafi from  Jersey
 Andrew Bulumakau from  Gloucester Rugby
 Tomasi Palu from  Wellington Lions

Players Out

Jersey

Players In
 Ryan Hodson from  Melbourne Rebels
 Derrick Herriott from  Northampton Saints
 Sam Lockwood from  Yorkshire Carnegie
 Ryan Glynn from  Northampton Saints
 Lewis Robling from  Newport Gwent Dragons
 Harry Williams from  Nottingham
 Pierce Phillips from  Darlington Mowden Park
 Tobias Hoskins from  Western Force
 Paula Kaho from  Havelock SC
 Gareth Harris from  Loughborough Students RUFC
 Nick Haining from  Western Force
 Jonny Bentley from  Gloucester Rugby
 Tommy Bell from  Wasps
 Ignacio Saenz Lancuba from  San Cirano
 Michael Noone from  Leicester Tigers
 Martin Garcia Veiga from  Pampas XV
 Jason Thomas from  Blue Bulls

Players Out
 Dave Young to  Newport Gwent Dragons
 James Voss to  Hartpury College R.F.C.
 Tom Fidler to  Plymouth Albion
 Elvis Taione to  Exeter Chiefs
 Seán McCarthy to  Leinster
 Tom Cooper retired
 Luke Stratford to  Hartpury College R.F.C.
 Rob Anderson released
 Niall O'Connor released
 Fred Silcock to  London Scottish
 Tom Brown to  Ealing Trailfinders
 Latu Makaafi to  Doncaster Knights
 Jimmy Williams to  Plymouth Albion
 James Copsey to  Ealing Trailfinders

London Scottish

Players In
 Peter Lydon from  Stade Francais
 Stewart Maguire from  Esher
 Matt Williams from  Moseley
 Mark Lilley from  Bristol Rugby (season-loan)
 Errie Claassens from  Bristol Rugby
 Fred Silcock from  Jersey
 Tai Tuisamoa from  London Welsh
 Max Maidment from  Cornish Pirates
 Ben Prescott from  Cornish Pirates
 Ben Calder from  Saracens
 James Phillips from  Exeter Chiefs
 Chris Walker from  Cottesloe

Players Out
 Tedd Stagg to  Plymouth Albion
 Lewis Thiede to  Rotherham Titans
 Tomas Francis to  Exeter Chiefs
 Eric Fry to  Newcastle Falcons
 Peter Homan to  Plymouth Albion
 Mark Irish retired
 Tyler Hotson from  Doncaster Knights

Moseley

Players In
 Ed Siggery from  Ealing Trailfinders
 Simon Gardiner from  Swansea RFC
 Scott Tolmie from  London Irish
 Drew Cheshire from  Gloucester Rugby
 Niles Dacres from  Stourbridge
 Charley Thomas from  Moseley Oak RFC
 Harry Hone from  Avonmouth Old Boys
 Louis Roach from  Silhillians
 Alex Foster from  Barking RFC

Players Out
 Rhys Buckley to  Newport Gwent Dragons
 Olly Robinson to  Bristol Rugby
 Buster Lawrence to  Wasps

Nottingham

Players In
 Dan Mugford from  Plymouth Albion
 Viliame Iongi unattached
 Paul Grant from  Montpellier
 Conor Carey from  Ealing Trailfinders
 Elliott Cox from  London Irish
 Cameron Lee-Everton from  Northampton Saints
 Liam O'Neill from  Wasps
 Billy Robinson from  Ealing Trailfinders
 Corey Venus from  Leicester Tigers
 Toby Freeman from  Rotherham Titans

Players Out
 David Jackson retired
 Harry Williams to  Jersey
 Matthew Jarvis to  Ealing Trailfinders
 Alex Shaw to  Doncaster Knights

Plymouth Albion

Players In
 Ted Stagg from  London Scottish
 Mark Kohler from  Coventry RFC
 Cameron Setter unattached
 Lawrence Rayner from  Old Albanian
 Josh Davies from  Newport Gwent Dragons
 Alistair Bone from  Loughborough Students RUFC
 Tom Cowan-Dickie from  Exeter Chiefs
 Tom Heard from  Gloucester Rugby
 Tom Fidler from  Jersey
 Neale Patrick from  Cornish Pirates
 Peter Horman from  London Scottish
 Jake Henry from  Cardiff Metropolitan University RFC
 Tom Jubb from  Saracens
 Elliot Clements-Hill from  Ampthill
 Luke Chapman from  Exeter Chiefs
 Andrew Tiedemann from  Castaway Wanderers
 Jimmy Williams from  Jersey
 Iain Grieve from  Bristol Rugby
 Marc Koteczky from  Randwick

Players Out
 Heath Stevens to  Worcester Warriors
 Dan Mugford to  Nottingham
 Sean-Michael Stephen retired
 Tom Bowen to  England Sevens
 Chris Elder to  London Welsh
 Paul Rowley to  London Welsh
 Ben Rogers released

Rotherham Titans

Players In
 Craig Dowsett from  Loughborough Students RUFC
 Lewis Thiede from  London Scottish
 William Ryan from  Cork Constitution
 Adam Macklin from  Ulster
 James McKinney from  Ulster
 Zylon McGaffin from  Darlington Mowden Park
 Tom Holmes from  Sale Sharks
 Perry Parker from  Edinburgh Rugby
 Scott Freer from  Yorkshire Carnegie
 Greg Lound from  Hull RUFC

Players Out
 Charlie Mulchrone to  Worcester Warriors
 Ben Sowrey to  Worcester Warriors
 Dan Sanderson to  Worcester Warriors
 Juan Pablo Socino to  Newcastle Falcons
 Laurence Pearce to  Leicester Tigers
 Colin Quigley to  Doncaster Knights
 Toby Freeman to  Nottingham
 Jack Roberts to  Leicester Tigers

Worcester Warriors

Players In
 Andries Pretorius from  Cardiff Blues
 Matt Cox from  Gloucester Rugby
 Ryan Mills from  Gloucester Rugby
 Gerrit-Jan van Velze from  Northampton Saints
 Charlie Mulchrone from  Rotherham Titans
 Joe Rees from  Ospreys
 Heath Stevens from  Plymouth Albion
 Sam Smith from  Harlequins
 Niall Annett from  Ulster
 Dan Sanderson from  Rotherham Titans
 Ben Sowrey from  Rotherham Titans
 Nick Schonert from  Free State Cheetahs
 Tom Biggs from  Bath Rugby
 Dan George from  Gloucester Rugby
 Ryan Bower from  Leicester Tigers
 Darren O'Shea from  Munster
 Jean-Baptiste Bruzulier from  Aix-en-Provence
 Val Rapava-Ruskin unattached
 Alex Gordaș from  CSM Olimpia Bucuresti
 Matt Gilbert from  Bath Rugby

Players Out
 Josh Matavesi to  Ospreys
 David Lemi to  Bristol Rugby
 Mariano Galarza to  Gloucester Rugby
 Danny Gray retired 
 Chris Brooker to  Bristol Rugby
 Ed Shervington to  Wasps
 Paul Hodgson retired
 John Andress to  Edinburgh Rugby
 Chris Jones to  Yorkshire Carnegie
 Paul Andrew to  Cornish Pirates
 Euan Murray to  Glasgow Warriors
 Dean Schofield to  London Welsh
 Jérémy Bécasseau to  USA Perpignan
 Nick Seymour to  Rouen 
 Jeremy Su'a to  Petrarca
 Jon Clarke to  Yorkshire Carnegie
 Paul Warwick retired
 Semisi Taulava to  Rouen 
 Jake Abbott to  Griffins
 Cameron Goodhue to  Northland

Yorkshire Carnegie

Players In
 Chris Pilgrim from  Newcastle Falcons
 James Fitzpatrick from  Newcastle Falcons
 Charlie Beech from  Bath Rugby
 Harry Leonard from  Edinburgh Rugby
 Chris Jones from  Worcester Warriors
 David McIlwaine from  Ulster
 Ollie Hayes from  Bristol Rugby
 James Tideswell from  London Welsh
 Jon Clarke from  Worcester Warriors

Players Out
 Craig Hampson to  Bristol Rugby
 Steve McColl to  Gloucester Rugby
 Calum Green to  Newcastle Falcons
 Sam Lockwood to  Jersey
 James Currie to  Bedford Blues
 Alex Lozowski to  Wasps
 Jacob Rowan to  Gloucester Rugby
 Damien Tussac to  US Montauban
 Scott Freer to  Rotherham Titans
 Josh Griffin to  Salford Red Devils

See also
List of 2014–15 Premiership Rugby transfers
List of 2014–15 Pro12 transfers
List of 2014–15 Top 14 transfers
List of 2014–15 Super Rugby transfers

References

2014-15
2014–15 RFU Championship